Nicholas Huish (fl. 1415), of Balsham, Cambridgeshire and Stansted Mountfitchet, Essex, was an English politician.

Family
Huish was married and had one daughter.

Career
He was a Member (MP) of the Parliament of England for Cambridgeshire in 1415.

References

14th-century births
15th-century deaths
English MPs 1415
People from Stansted Mountfitchet
People from Balsham